Subhan Quli Qutb Shah (1543–1550) was 7 years old, when he became Sultan of Golconda, after the death of his father Jamsheed Quli Qutb Shah, in 1550. Saif Khan, also known as Ainul Mulk, was sent from Ahmednagar for the performance of duties of regent during the boy's development.  But Jamsheed's younger brother Ibrahim Quli Qutb Shah returned from Vijayanagara to Golconda, and ascended the throne. Subhan was deposed, and died of illness or was murdered in the same year.

External links
 Institute of Oriental culture, University of Tokyo feature

1543 births
1550 deaths
Telugu people
Qutb Shahi dynasty